The National League for Democracy (NLD) is a political party in Tanzania. The party was registered on 21 March 1993.

In elections held on 14 December 2005, NLD presidential candidate Emmanuel Makaidi placed seventh out of ten candidates, winning 0.19% of the vote. The party failed to win any seats in National Assembly elections held on the same day.

1993 establishments in Tanzania
Political parties established in 1993
Political parties in Tanzania